The EAC-1 is a folding-parasol wing aircraft developed by the Engineers Aircraft Corporation of Stamford, Connecticut.

Design and development
The EAC-1 was designed to be a low-cost sport aircraft for casual use, that could be stored in a space as small as 11 X 20 feet.

The aircraft has conventional landing gear, an open cockpit, strut braces and a parasol wing with swept sections. The fuselage is constructed of welded steel tubing with doped aircraft fabric covering.

Specifications (EAC-1)

See also

References

1930s United States civil utility aircraft
Single-engined tractor aircraft
EAC-1
Parasol-wing aircraft